Manhattan Boogie-Woogie is the third and final album by Landscape and was released in 1982. It is the only Landscape album that does not include any instrumental tracks.

The album was reissued in November 2009 on the Cherry Pop label. This CD also includes Landscape's self-titled debut album Landscape.

Track listing

LP: RCA LP 6037

2009 Cherry Pop CD: CR POP 36

Personnel
Landscape
Richard James Burgess - drums, drums electronica, vocals, computer programming
Christopher Heaton - synthesizers, piano, Minimoog, vocals
Andy Pask - bass guitar, fretless bass, vocals
Peter Thoms - electric trombone, trombone, vocals
John Walters - Lyricon, soprano saxophone, vocals, computer programming

Production
Producer: Landscape
Engineers: Mike Gregovich, Andy Jackson, Neil Black, Pete Smith, Richard James Burgess
Design: Ian Wright
Art direction: Andrew Christian
Original photography: Brian Aris

Audio excerpts

References

1982 albums
Landscape (band) albums
RCA Records albums
Albums produced by Richard James Burgess